Margaret Ekua Prah is a Ghanaian diplomat and a member of the New Patriotic Party of Ghana. She is currently Ghana's ambassador to Zambia.

Ambassadorial appointment 
In July 2017, President Nana Akuffo-Addo named Margaret Prah as Ghana's ambassador to Zambia. She was among twenty two other distinguished Ghanaians who were named to head various diplomatic Ghanaian mission in the world.

References

Living people
High Commissioners of Ghana to Zambia
Ghanaian women ambassadors
Year of birth missing (living people)